Cap Ferret (English: Cape Ferret) is a headland, situated at the south end of the commune of Lège-Cap-Ferret in the French department of Gironde and region of Nouvelle-Aquitaine. The headland takes the form of a spit, which separates the Atlantic Ocean from Arcachon Bay. At the same time, the entrance to Arcachon Bay separates Cap Ferret from the resort town of Arcachon.

Cap Ferret is famous for its lighthouse and as an up-market resort that has retained its natural feel at the heart of the Landes of Gascony and the Pays de Buch. It is also famous for its ostreicole (oyster-farming) activity and numerous tasting sites.

Cap Ferret is accessible by road from the north, and by passenger ferry from Arcachon. The Tramway du Cap-Ferret, a diesel operated narrow-gauge railway, links the ferry landing at Bélisaire on the shores of Arcachon Bay with the beaches on the Atlantic coast.

Gallery

References

External links 

  Panoramas of Cap Ferret
  Official web site of Cap Ferret
  Discover Cap Ferret in catamaran 
  The lighthouse on the site World Wide Panorama

Ferret
Surfing locations in France
Tourist attractions in Gironde
Landforms of Gironde
Sports venues in Gironde